Hanakoa Valley is a hanging valley along the Kalalau Trail along the Nā Pali Coast of the island of Kauai in the state of Hawaii. Hanakoa has primitive camping via permit only. It is located on mile 6 of the Kalalau Trail, often used as a resting destination for hikers completing the Kalalau Trail to Kalalau Valley. Nearby Hanakoa Falls is accessible by an unmaintained trail.

References

External links 
Kauai Explorer - Kalalau Trail
Kalalau Trail - Info

Valleys of Kauai